Saima Shoukat (born 6 December 1984, in Lahore) is a Pakistani professional squash player. As of July 2018, she was ranked number 188 in the world. She has represented Pakistan internationally.

References

1984 births
Living people
Pakistani female squash players
Squash players at the 2010 Asian Games
Asian Games competitors for Pakistan
21st-century Pakistani women